Rockstar Leeds Limited (formerly Möbius Entertainment Limited) is a British video game developer and a studio of Rockstar Games based in Leeds. Ian J. Bowden, Dave Box, Gordon Hall, and Jason McGann founded the company as Möbius Entertainment in December 1997 after working together at the studio Hookstone. Möbius worked with SCi on two games: Alfred's Adventure, a remake of the Twilight-developed Alfred Chicken, and the cancelled Titanium Angels, an adaptation of Thunderbirds. From 2001 on, the studio created Game Boy Advance games for several publishers, including multiple for The 3DO Company and Max Payne for Rockstar Games.

By the time the PlayStation Portable was announced, Möbius had developed a game engine that targeted similar technical specifications. This attracted several parties interested in buying the studio, including Rockstar Games. The publisher's parent company, Take-Two Interactive, acquired Möbius in March 2004, and the studio became part of Rockstar Games as Rockstar Leeds. Thereafter, the studio created several PlayStation Portable games, including the original games Grand Theft Auto: Liberty City Stories, Grand Theft Auto: Vice City Stories, Grand Theft Auto: Chinatown Wars, and Beaterator, as well as ports of Midnight Club 3: Dub Edition, The Warriors, and Manhunt 2. Since 2007, several employees (including Bowden, Hall, and McGann) have left Rockstar Leeds to take sabbaticals, establish studios, or join other companies.

History

Early years (1997–2003) 

Rockstar Leeds was founded as Möbius Entertainment by Ian J. Bowden, Dave Box, Gordon Hall, and Jason McGann. McGann had previously worked for the Harrogate-based studio Enigma Variations until 1989, when the firing of one programmer led several employees, including McGann, to resign and set up Twilight. During his tenure at the newer company, McGann conceived the game Alfred Chicken, originally based on Rainbow Islands and later influenced by Super Mario World. A demo was presented to Ocean Software, which had released some of Twilight's previous games, and the company was interested in publishing Alfred Chicken if its titular protagonist was replaced by Woodstock from the Peanuts franchise. Backed by the development team, McGann refused this offer as he wished to keep the character he had created. The studio instead worked with agent John Cook on a deal with publisher Mindscape that allowed Twilight to retain the game's intellectual property. The game was released for the Game Boy in 1993.

McGann and Peter Tattersall, the artist for Alfred Chicken, left Twilight in 1994 to found Hookstone, and what remained of Twilight agreed to transfer the game's rights to the new company. Early on, Hookstone hired Hall (who had known McGann since 1990) as a programmer and Bowden as a junior artist. Hall described himself as "a programmer with an eye on the business side" and quickly noticed that the company "didn't have long left to live". Bowden, Box, Hall, and McGann consequently established Möbius in December 1997. The company moved into the converted 18th-century building of the former St Paul's Parish Church in the Stanningley district of Pudsey, a town close to Leeds. Möbius was without salary for about sixteen months until it signed its first publishing contract. During this time, the founders found that they worked best as a small team and regarded handheld games as the best fit for such a team size. Its first project was a remake of Alfred Chicken for the Game Boy Color, titled Alfred's Adventure. The game was released by SCi in Europe in June 2000. After its release, Möbius switched agents from Cook to Emma Killilea, who pitched Alfred Chicken to Sony. At the time, that company was looking for family-friendly games for its PlayStation console, which was nearing the end of its lifecycle, and greenlit an Alfred Chicken remake for the platform. That game was released in 2002.

For SCi, Möbius also developed Titanium Angels, an adaptation of the 1960s TV series Thunderbirds. The studio had been working on a game engine, Revelation, for several years and commenced the game's production when the publisher signed it onto the project in 1999. SCi announced Titanium Angels in January 2000 and, in September of that year, projected it to be released for the PlayStation 2 in late 2001. When Möbius was questioned on the game's status in October 2003, it said that the game had been cancelled "some time ago". With publisher The 3DO Company, Möbius developed the Game Boy Advance conversions of High Heat Major League Baseball 2002 and High Heat Major League Baseball 2003, as well as the game Army Men: Turf Wars. Other early Game Boy Advance project by Möbius include Bionicle, Drome Racers, and A Sound of Thunder, an tie-in for the film of the same name. The latter was announced at E3 2002 and scheduled to be released later that year, before the film. The game was finished in 2002 but remained unreleased for some time as publisher BAM! Entertainment was waiting for the completion of the game's console versions. Finally, Möbius developed the Game Boy Advance adaptation of Max Payne for Rockstar Games.

Acquisition and PlayStation Portable projects (2002–2009) 
Around 2002, Möbius created an internal team to develop a game engine for a prospective high-performance handheld console, such as what would be a "GameCube in your hand" by Nintendo. It joined the Game Republic studio network in the same year and, in December, acquired and absorbed Yorkshire-based handheld game developer Spellbound to bring the headcount up to thirty. When Sony announced the PlayStation Portable, it had technical specifications similar to those envisioned by Möbius for its game engine. The studio could quickly ready its technology for the device, which attracted three publishers that sought to acquire the studio and two that offered partnerships in which Möbius would have stayed independent. One of the publishers wanted the studio to create eight PlayStation Portable games annually, which Hall believed "means less love from the publisher and a bloody hard slog to get those games done". Rockstar Games was among those interested in buying Möbius and was the only one that did not intend for the studio of thirty-seven employees to grow quickly if acquired. Therefore, Möbius chose to be purchased by that company. The deal was announced on 8 April 2004 and the studio became part of Rockstar Games as Rockstar Leeds. Take-Two intended for the studio to develop PlayStation Portable games and further Game Boy Advance titles. Necroscope, a PlayStation 2 and Xbox game based on Brian Lumley's eponymous horror novel series, was cancelled in the process.

Under its new ownership, Rockstar Leeds was offered to develop games in the Grand Theft Auto series, which was a surprise as the prior games had been handled by Rockstar North. The studio accepted and, in January 2005, was announced as working on two PlayStation Portable games: A port of Midnight Club 3: Dub Edition and an original Grand Theft Auto title based on Liberty City, the setting of 2001's Grand Theft Auto III. The former was developed under the oversight of the game's original developer, Rockstar San Diego, and released in June 2005. The studio cooperated with Rockstar North on the latter, which was announced as Grand Theft Auto: Liberty City Stories in May 2005. It was released in October of that year to positive reviews. A successor, Grand Theft Auto: Vice City Stories, was released in October 2006. By November 2005, Rockstar Leeds had relocated from Pudsey to the City West business park in Leeds.

Rockstar Leeds further created the PlayStation Portable versions of The Warriors and Manhunt 2, as well as the Wii port of Rockstar Games Presents Table Tennis, all released in 2007. The studio developed Grand Theft Auto: Chinatown Wars, the debut title of the Grand Theft Auto series on the Nintendo DS. Released in March 2009, the game received critical acclaim and became the highest-rated Nintendo DS game on Metacritic. However, it was commercially unsuccessful, selling only 88,000 of the expected 200,000 copies in its first month. Rockstar Leeds' Beaterator, a Timbaland-themed remake of a 2005 web game of the same name, was released in September 2009.

Development collaborations and departures (2007–present) 
McGann left Rockstar Leeds in 2007 to take a sabbatical after nineteen years in the video game industry. By August of that year, the company had grown to 70 people. At this time, Hall stated the studio's intent to create original intellectual properties for next-generation platforms and step away from handheld development. Rockstar Leeds subsequently assisted Rockstar San Diego in the development of Red Dead Redemption. Hall and several Rockstar Leeds staffers spent one year in the United States to work on the game on-site. In November 2011, the studio ported L.A. Noire to Windows.

Lee Hutchinson and Matt Shepcar announced in February 2010 that they had left Rockstar Leeds to establish Double Eleven. Senior designer Simon Iwaniszak resigned from Rockstar Leeds to briefly join Double Eleven and later found Red Kite Games in early 2012. Hall took a sabbatical in 2011 to research player psychology and microtransactions strategy and joined Activision's mobile-focused The Blast Furnace studio as chief creative officer in August 2012. After exiting the video game industry in 2015, he pursued various hobbies until his death in March 2021 at the age 51. In August 2014, Bowden left Rockstar Leeds to become the art director at the German social-network game developer GameDuell.

In July 2014, Rockstar Games contracted the property consultancy WSB to find  of office space in Leeds. Rockstar Leeds had moved to 1 Victoria Place in the city's Holbeck area by November 2016. The studio co-developed 2013's Grand Theft Auto V and worked alongside all other Rockstar Games studios on Red Dead Redemption 2, which was released in October 2018.

Accolades 
Rockstar Leeds won "Best Handheld Games Studio" and was a finalist for "Best In-House Team" at the 2009 Develop Industry Excellence Awards.

Games developed

As Möbius Entertainment

As Rockstar Leeds

Cancelled 
 Titanium Angels
 Necroscope

References 

1997 establishments in England
2004 mergers and acquisitions
British subsidiaries of foreign companies
Companies based in Leeds
Rockstar Games subsidiaries
Take-Two Interactive divisions and subsidiaries
Video game companies established in 1997
Video game companies of the United Kingdom
Video game development companies